Offenburg station is a railway station in Baden-Württemberg and has seven tracks on four platforms. Offenburg used to be a railway town and the station was of major economic importance to it. In recent years the maintenance facilities and much of the rail freight yards have been closed.  The station is very centrally located within the city and is easily accessible by 18 different bus routes from the central bus station, 50 metres from the railway station.

Rail services
InterCityExpress services operate through the station every two hours between Berlin, Frankfurt and Basel and less frequently between Cologne, Frankfurt Airport and Basel. InterCity trains operate from a variety of destinations in Germany and Switzerland. Regional-Express trains operate to and from Karlsruhe, Basel Bad and Konstanz. Regional rail services are operated as the Ortenau-S-Bahn, by Südwestdeutsche Verkehrs-Aktiengesellschaft, a company owned by Baden-Württemberg.

History
The station was designed by the architect, Friedrich Eisenlohr (1805–1855), as a smaller version of the old railway station in Karlsruhe, opened in 1843 and closed in 1913. During World War I several attacks were carried out on the station. The most serious of these took place on 22 July 1918 with four direct hits leading to the collapse of the entire central part of the station entrance building. During the Occupation of the Ruhr in February 1923, Offenburg and Appenweier were also occupied, disrupting the Rhine Valley Railway. Therefore, until 12 December 1923  trains on the Baden Mainline had to be diverted on the route through the Black Forest towns of Donaueschingen, Hausach, Freudenstadt, Hochdorf towards Pforzheim.

References

Railway stations in Baden-Württemberg
Railway stations in Germany opened in 1844
station
1844 establishments in Baden
Mannheim–Karlsruhe–Basel railway
Buildings and structures in Ortenaukreis